The Ellis Basin cave system is a group of interconnecting limestone caves located in the Mount Arthur region of the northwest South Island of New Zealand.

In April 2010, the cave system was found to be deeper than the nearby Nettlebed Cave, making it the deepest known cave in New Zealand. It has been explored to a depth of 1,024 metres, and its 33.4 kilometres of cave passages make it New Zealand's second longest.

The Ellis Basin cave system was first explored by cavers in the 1960s.

References

External links
Caving areas in New Zealand

Caves of the Tasman District